Meliteieis (Greek: Μελιτειείς) is a former municipality on the island of Corfu, Ionian Islands, Greece. Since the 2019 local government reform it is part of the municipality South Corfu, of which it is a municipal unit. It is located in the southern part of the island of Corfu. It has a land area of 67.054 km² and a population of 5,106 inhabitants (2011 census). The seat of the municipality was the town of Moraitika (pop. 553). Its largest towns are Ágios Matthaíos (pop. 1,088), Moraïtika, Stroggylí (448), Chlomós (357), and Áno Pavliána (442).

References

Populated places in Corfu (regional unit)